Brickellia knappiana, or Knapp brickellbush, is a North American species of flowering plants in the family Asteraceae. It grows in desert mountain ranges in southern California (Inyo, San Bernardino, and San Diego Counties) and southern Nevada (Nye and Clark Counties).

Brickellia knappiana is a shrub up to 200 cm (80 inches) tall. It produces many small flower heads with white disc florets but no ray florets.

References

knappiana
Flora of California
Flora of Nevada
Plants described in 1888